Caledonian Road Primary School is a former school building in Perth, Perth and Kinross. Dating from 1892 and made of red sandstone, it is now a Category B listed building. The building, which is located at the western edge of Perth's city centre, was designed by uncle-nephew duo Andrew Heiton and Andrew Granger Heiton.

Current use
The building ceased to be a school in October 2010, and was divided into 24 flats around seven years later, owned by Caledonia Housing Association. Health and safety rules meant the building's atrium was sealed off, to be made accessible only on special occasions. The project also involved a new block, of 21 flats, constructed in the school's former playground. Also, six additional properties were built in an annex building that formerly housed the school's gymnasium, cafeteria and after-school club.

Notable former students 

 Ann Gloag, businesswoman

See also
List of listed buildings in Perth, Perth and Kinross

References

Category B listed buildings in Perth and Kinross
Listed buildings in Perth, Scotland
Schools in Perth, Scotland
Primary schools in Perth and Kinross
1892 establishments in Scotland
Listed schools in Scotland
School buildings completed in 1892
Defunct schools in Perth and Kinross